Pierre Sprécher (9 November 1921 – 7 November 2003) was a French athlete. He competed in the men's javelin throw and the men's decathlon at the 1948 Summer Olympics.

References

1921 births
2003 deaths
Athletes (track and field) at the 1948 Summer Olympics
French male javelin throwers
French decathletes
Olympic athletes of France
Sportspeople from Amiens